Michael Zerbes (born 13 September 1944) is a German sprinter. He competed in the men's 400 metres at the 1968 Summer Olympics representing East Germany.

References

1944 births
Living people
Athletes (track and field) at the 1968 Summer Olympics
German male sprinters
Olympic athletes of East Germany